is a railway station on the Kyūdai Main Line in Kokonoe, Ōita Prefecture, Japan.

Lines

Layout 
The station consists of a side platform serving a single track at grade. The station building is a small structure of traditional Japanese plaster wall design which is unstaffed and serves only as a waiting room. From the station building, a short flight of steps leads up to the platform.

Adjacent stations

History
The Daito Railway was nationalized on 1 December 1922, after which Japanese Government Railways (JGR) undertook phased westward expansion of the track which, at the time, it had designated as the Daito Line. By 1928, the track had reached . Subsequently, the track was extended further west and Bungo-Mori was opened as the new western terminus on 15 December 1929. On the same day, Hikiji was opened as an intermediate station along the new track. On 15 November 1934, when the Daito Line had linked up with the Kyudai Main Line further west, JGR designated the station as part of the Kyudai Main Line. With the privatization of Japanese National Railways (JNR), the successor of JGR, on 1 April 1987, the station came under the control of JR Kyushu.

Passenger statistics
In fiscal 2015, there were a total of 17,379 boarding passengers, giving a daily average of 48 passengers.

See also
 List of railway stations in Japan

References

External links
Hikiji (JR Kyushu)

Railway stations in Ōita Prefecture
Railway stations in Japan opened in 1929